Laila is a 1958 Swedish-West German drama film directed by Rolf Husberg and starring Erika Remberg, Edvin Adolphson and Isa Quensel. It was shot at the Centrumateljéerna Studios in Stockholm. The film's sets and costumes were designed by the art director Harald Garmland.

Cast
 Erika Remberg as Laila Logje
 Edvin Adolphson as 	Aslak Logje
 Isa Quensel as 	Elli Logje
 Birger Malmsten as 	Mellet Omma
 Joachim Hansen as Anders Lind
 Ann-Marie Gyllenspetz as 	Inger Lind
 Alfred Maurstad as 	Jompa
 Annalisa Wenström as 	Kari
 Rune Ottoson as 	Kari's Husband
 Birger Lensander as 	Kari's Father
 Sif Ruud as 	Mrs. Johansson
 Bengt Blomgren as Nielsen
 Anne Blomberg as Mrs. Nielsen
 Bengt Eklund as 	Björneberg
 Wiktor Andersson as 	Mortensson
 Christian Bratt as 	Preacher
 Bernt Callenbo as 	Young Drunk Man
 Ragnar Falck as Constable
 Helge Hagerman as 	Parish Constable
 Ninni Löfberg as 	Nurse Gerda
 Sune Mangs as 	Speaker at the reindeer race
 Sten Mattsson as 	Hatti
 Thore Segelström as 	Hotti
 Willie Sjöberg as 	Pieti
 Sonja Westerbergh as Rasmussen, teacher
 Inga-Lill Åhström as 	Hilda
 Georg Årlin as 	Parish constable
Ivar Wahlgren as 	Priest

References

Bibliography 
 Goble, Alan. The Complete Index to Literary Sources in Film. Walter de Gruyter, 1999.
 Wright, Rochelle. The Visible Wall: Jews and Other Ethnic Outsiders in Swedish Film. SIU Press, 1998.

External links 
 

1958 films
Swedish drama films
German drama films
West German films
1958 drama films
1950s German-language films
1950s Swedish-language films
Films directed by Rolf Husberg
Films based on Norwegian novels
UFA GmbH films
1950s Swedish films
1950s German films